CZI may refer to:

Chan Zuckerberg Initiative, a limited liability company founded in the United States
Confederation of Zimbabwe Industries, the primary organisation for industry in Zimbabwe
Crazy Woman Creek, with FAA three-letter station designator CZI